East Essex or Essex East may refer to:

 Essex East (electoral district), Ontario, Canada, 1925–1968
 East Essex (UK Parliament constituency), 1868–1885